Hector Harold Brown (December 11, 1924 – December 17, 2015) was an American professional baseball player and right-handed pitcher. He played in Major League Baseball from  through  for the Chicago White Sox, Boston Red Sox, Baltimore Orioles, New York Yankees and Houston Colt .45s. Brown was a knuckleballer with outstanding control who worked as both a starting pitcher and as a relief pitcher. He played for all or portions of eight seasons (1955–1962) with the Orioles, posting a 62–48 won–lost record, and was inducted into the Baltimore Orioles Hall of Fame in 1991. He was a veteran of the United States Army Air Forces who served in the European theatre of World War II.

Baseball career
Brown was born in Greensboro, North Carolina, and was nicknamed "Skinny" by his parents because he was a chubby child. He was 26 years old when the White Sox purchased his contract from the Triple-A Seattle Rainiers and he made his major league debut with the team on April 19, 1951. He spent two years with the ChiSox before moving to the Red Sox, the team that had originally signed him to a pro contract in 1946. In , Brown went 11–6 in 25 starts. He joined the Orioles in July 1955, winning 34 games for them from 1956 to 1959. In , he compiled a 12–5 mark with a career-low 3.06 ERA for a contending Baltimore team that finished second in the American League. The next year, he went 10–6 and 3.19 He was sold to the pennant-bound Yankees in September 1962.

Brown worked in two late-season games for the Yankees, and was ineligible for the Bombers' 1962 World Series roster. He was purchased by the Colt .45s at the outset of the  season. It was the third time that Houston general manager Paul Richards, who managed Brown in Seattle in 1950, had acquired the right-handed pitcher — he had done so in 1951 when Richards managed the White Sox and in 1955 when he was both general manager and field manager with the Orioles.

With Houston in 1963, Brown was a victim of poor run support, as he walked just eight batters in 141 innings and posted a 3.31 ERA, but tallied a 5–11 record. In , his last major league season, he finished 3–15 with a 3.95 ERA.

In a 14-season major league career, Brown posted an 85–92 record with a 3.81 ERA in 358 appearances, including 211 starts, 47 complete games, 13 shutouts,  11 saves, 1,680 innings pitched, and a 1.83 strikeout-to-walk ratio (710-to-389). He allowed 1,677 hits, but only 389 bases on balls, 14 hit by pitches and 37 wild pitches as a major leaguer.

League Leader
Twice led American League in Walks/9IP (1.76 in 1959; 1.25 in 1960)
Led AL in WHIP (1.113 in 1960)
Baltimore Orioles Hall of Fame

References

External links

Retrosheet

1924 births
2015 deaths
Baltimore Orioles players
Baseball players from Greensboro, North Carolina
Boston Red Sox players
Chicago White Sox players
Durham Bulls players
Houston Colt .45s players
Knuckleball pitchers
Louisville Colonels (minor league) players
Major League Baseball pitchers
New York Yankees players
Oakland Oaks (baseball) players
Professional Basketball League of America players
Roanoke Red Sox players
Scranton Red Sox players
Seattle Rainiers players
Basketball players from Greensboro, North Carolina
United States Army Air Forces personnel of World War II
Grimsley High School alumni